Hypercompe suffusa is a moth of the family Erebidae. It was described by William Schaus in 1889. It is found in southern Arizona, western Texas and Mexico.

The wingspan is about 42 mm for males and 54 mm for females.

The larvae are polyphagous. The species overwinters in a loose cocoon. Pupation occurs in spring.

References

Hypercompe
Moths described in 1889